47 Ophiuchi (47 Oph) is a binary star in the constellation Serpens. The combined apparent magnitude of the system is 4.54. The system is located about 98.1 light-years, or 30.1 parsecs away, based on its parallax as measured by Hipparcos.
 
47 Ophiuchi is a spectroscopic binary: that is, the two stars move fast enough that periodic Doppler shifts in the stars' spectra can be detected. In this case, the two stars have also been resolved using interferometry. The primary star is an F-type main-sequence star, that is 1.5 times the mass of the Sun and around twice as wide. Its companion star is 1.34 times the mass of the Sun, and 1.36 times the radius of the Sun. The two stars orbit each other every 26.3 days, and its orbital eccentricity is 0.481.
 
The designation 47 Ophiuchi was originally used for the star HR 6496. However, when constellation borders were redrawn, the star fell into the constellation Serpens, and the designation became used for this star, HR 6493, instead.

References

 

Serpens (constellation)
F-type main-sequence stars
Ophiuchi, 47
Durchmusterung objects
157950
085365
6493
Spectroscopic binaries